Nuer is a zone in Gambela Region of Ethiopia. It was created from former Administrative Zone 3 of Gambela. This zone is bordered by South Sudan on the south, west and northand by Anuak Zone on the east; the Pibor defines the border on the south and west, while the Baro defines it for the northern border. Towns in this zone include Tiergol, Matar, Nyinenyang, Kuachthiang and Kuergeng. Nuer Zone consists of five woredas: Akobo, Jikawo, Lare, Makuey (Woreda) and Wentawo (Matar).

Nuer Zone is within the Ethiopian lowlands and is flat at an elevation between 400–430 meters above sea level. The zone consists of grasslands, marshes and swamps with some forests. The economy is predominantly based on livestock. In 2006, there were no agricultural cooperatives, no documented roads, and little other infrastructure. Both Jikawo and Akobo woredas are flooded during the rainy season, requiring the people to migrate to the highlands with their cattle until the waters recede; thus raising livestock is the primary source of income in this Zone.

Demographics
Based on the 2007 Census conducted by the Central Statistical Agency of Ethiopia (CSA), this Zone has a total population of 112,606, of whom 60,543 are men and 52,063 women. 12,266 or 10.89% of population are urban inhabitants. The three largest ethnic groups of Nuer were the Nuer (95.56%), the Anuak (2.06%) and the Sidama (1.16%); all other ethnic groups made up 1.22% of the population. Nuer was spoken as a first language by 96.68%, and 2.06% speak Anuak; the remaining 1.26% spoke all other primary languages reported. The largest group of the inhabitants said they were Protestant, with 88.82% of the population reporting they embraced that belief, while 5.7% practiced traditional religions, 5.3% were Muslim, 3.26% were Catholic, and 1.44% professed Ethiopian Orthodox Christianity.

Notes

Gambela Region
Zones of Ethiopia